International Convention on Standards of Training, Certification and Watchkeeping for Seafarers (STCW) sets minimum qualification standards for masters, officers and watch personnel on seagoing merchant ships and large yachts. STCW was adopted in 1978 by the International Maritime Organization (IMO) conference in London, and entered into force in 1984. The Convention was significantly amended in 1995 and 2010 entered into force on 1 January 2012.

The 1978 STCW Convention was the first to establish minimum basic requirements on training, certification and watchkeeping for seafarers on an international level. Previously the minimum standards of training, certification and watchkeeping of officers and ratings were established by individual governments, usually without reference to practices in other countries. As a result, minimum standards and procedures varied widely, even though shipping is extremely international by nature.

The Convention prescribes minimum standards relating to training, certification and watchkeeping for seafarers which countries are obliged to meet or exceed.

The Convention did not deal with manning levels: IMO provisions in this area are covered by regulation 14 of Chapter V of the International Convention for the Safety of Life at Sea (SOLAS), 1974, whose requirements are backed up by resolution A.890(21) Principles of safe manning, adopted by the IMO Assembly in 1999, which replaced an earlier resolution A.481(XII) adopted in 1981 and has since been itself replaced by resolution A.1047(27) Principles of Minimum Safe Manning, adopted by the IMO Assembly in 2011.

One especially important feature of the Convention is that it applies to ships of non-party states when visiting ports of States which are Parties to the Convention. Article X requires Parties to apply the control measures to ships of all flags to the extent necessary to ensure that no more favourable treatment is given to ships entitled to fly the flag of a State which is not a Party than is given to ships entitled to fly the flag of a State that is a Party.

The difficulties which could arise for ships of States which are not Parties to the Convention is one reason why the Convention has received such wide acceptance. By 2018, the STCW Convention had 164 Parties, representing 99.2 per cent of world shipping tonnage.

1995 revision
On 7 July 1995, the IMO adopted a comprehensive revision of STCW. It also included a proposal to develop a new STCW Code, which would contain the technical details associated with provisions of the Convention. The amendments entered force on 1 February 1997. Full implementation was required by 1 February 2002. Mariners already holding certification had the option to renew the certificates in accordance with the old rules of the 1978 Convention during the period ending on 1 February 2002. Mariners entering training programs after 1 August 1998 are required to meet the competency standards of the new 1995 Amendments.

The most significant amendments concerned:
a) enhancement of port state control;
b) communication of information to IMO to allow for mutual oversight and consistency in application of standards,
c) quality standards systems (QSS), oversight of training, assessment, and certification procedures,
The Amendments require that seafarers be provided

Manila Amendments
The IMO Convention on Standards of Training Certification and Watchkeeping of Seafarers adopted a new set of amendments in Manila in 2010 called "The Manila Amendments". These amendments were necessary to keep training standards in line with new technological and operational requirements that require new shipboard competencies. The Manila Amendments were effective as of 1 January 2012. There is a transition period until 2017 when all seafarers must be certified and trained according to the new standards. Implementation is progressive, every year a modified set of requirements comes into force. The most significant amendments are:
 New rest hours for seafarers
 New grades of certificates of competency for able seafarers in both deck and engine  
 New and updated training, refreshing requirements 
 Mandatory security training 
 Additional medical standards 
 Specific Alcohol limits in blood or breath.

STCW-F Convention
On 7 July 1995, the International Convention on Standards of Training, Certification and Watchkeeping for Fishing Vessel Personnel was adopted as a separate treaty as part of the comprehensive revisions to STCW. It applies the principles of STCW to fishing vessels from ratifying states that are 24 metres in length and above. STCW-F came into force on 29 September 2012.

See also
Merchant Mariner Credential, a US credential
Seaman Service Book, credential in Pakistan
Continuous Discharge Certificate, in India
Merchant Mariner's Document, UK and formerly US

References

External links
 IMO  information regarding STCW
 US Coast Guard information regarding STCW
 Maritime Skills Academy Overview of history of STCW.
 UN provided text of the STCW convention

Admiralty law treaties
International Maritime Organization treaties
Treaties concluded in 1978
Treaties entered into force in 1984
Treaties of Albania
Treaties of Algeria
Treaties of the People's Republic of Angola
Treaties of Antigua and Barbuda
Treaties of Argentina
Treaties of Australia
Treaties of Austria
Treaties of Azerbaijan
Treaties of the Bahamas
Treaties of Bahrain
Treaties of Bangladesh
Treaties of Barbados
Treaties of Belgium
Treaties of Belize
Treaties of the People's Republic of Benin
Treaties of Bolivia
Treaties of the military dictatorship in Brazil
Treaties of Brunei
Treaties of the People's Republic of Bulgaria
Treaties of Myanmar
Treaties of Cambodia
Treaties of Cameroon
Treaties of Canada
Treaties of Cape Verde
Treaties of Chile
Treaties of the People's Republic of China
Treaties of Colombia
Treaties of the Comoros
Treaties of Zaire
Treaties of the Republic of the Congo
Treaties of the Cook Islands
Treaties of Costa Rica
Treaties of Ivory Coast
Treaties of Croatia
Treaties of Cuba
Treaties of Cyprus
Treaties of the Czech Republic
Treaties of Czechoslovakia
Treaties of Denmark
Treaties of Djibouti
Treaties of Dominica
Treaties of the Dominican Republic
Treaties of Ecuador
Treaties of Egypt
Treaties of El Salvador
Treaties of Equatorial Guinea
Treaties of Eritrea
Treaties of Estonia
Treaties of the Derg
Treaties of Fiji
Treaties of Finland
Treaties of France
Treaties of Gabon
Treaties of the Gambia
Treaties of Georgia (country)
Treaties of West Germany
Treaties of East Germany
Treaties of Ghana
Treaties of Greece
Treaties of Grenada
Treaties of Guatemala
Treaties of Guinea
Treaties of Guinea-Bissau
Treaties of Guyana
Treaties of Haiti
Treaties of Honduras
Treaties of the Hungarian People's Republic
Treaties of Iceland
Treaties of India
Treaties of Indonesia
Treaties of Iran
Treaties of Ba'athist Iraq
Treaties of Ireland
Treaties of Israel
Treaties of Italy
Treaties of Jamaica
Treaties of Japan
Treaties of Jordan
Treaties of Kazakhstan
Treaties of Kenya
Treaties of Kiribati
Treaties of North Korea
Treaties of South Korea
Treaties of Kuwait
Treaties of Latvia
Treaties of Lebanon
Treaties of Liberia
Treaties of the Libyan Arab Jamahiriya
Treaties of Lithuania
Treaties of Luxembourg
Treaties of Madagascar
Treaties of Malawi
Treaties of Malaysia
Treaties of the Maldives
Treaties of Malta
Treaties of the Marshall Islands
Treaties of Mauritania
Treaties of Mauritius
Treaties of Mexico
Treaties of the Federated States of Micronesia
Treaties of Moldova
Treaties of Mongolia
Treaties of Montenegro
Treaties of Morocco
Treaties of the People's Republic of Mozambique
Treaties of Namibia
Treaties of the Netherlands
Treaties of New Zealand
Treaties of Nicaragua
Treaties of Nigeria
Treaties of Niue
Treaties of Norway
Treaties of Oman
Treaties of Pakistan
Treaties of Palau
Treaties of Panama
Treaties of Papua New Guinea
Treaties of Peru
Treaties of the Philippines
Treaties of the Polish People's Republic
Treaties of Portugal
Treaties of Qatar
Treaties of Romania
Treaties of Saint Kitts and Nevis
Treaties of Saint Lucia
Treaties of Saint Vincent and the Grenadines
Treaties of Samoa
Treaties of São Tomé and Príncipe
Treaties of Saudi Arabia
Treaties of Senegal
Treaties of Serbia and Montenegro
Treaties of Seychelles
Treaties of Sierra Leone
Treaties of Singapore
Treaties of Slovakia
Treaties of Slovenia
Treaties of the Solomon Islands
Treaties of South Africa
Treaties of the Soviet Union
Treaties of Francoist Spain
Treaties of Sri Lanka
Treaties of the Republic of the Sudan (1985–2011)
Treaties of Suriname
Treaties of Sweden
Treaties of Switzerland
Treaties of Syria
Treaties of Tanzania
Treaties of Thailand
Treaties of Togo
Treaties of Tonga
Treaties of Trinidad and Tobago
Treaties of Tunisia
Treaties of Turkey
Treaties of Turkmenistan
Treaties of Tuvalu
Treaties of Ukraine
Treaties of the United Arab Emirates
Treaties of the United Kingdom
Treaties of the United States
Treaties of Uruguay
Treaties of Vanuatu
Treaties of Venezuela
Treaties of Vietnam
Treaties of Yemen
Treaties of Yugoslavia
1978 in London
Treaties extended to the Isle of Man
Treaties extended to Bermuda
Treaties extended to the Cayman Islands
Treaties extended to Gibraltar
Treaties extended to the British Virgin Islands
Treaties extended to the Netherlands Antilles
Treaties extended to Aruba
Treaties extended to the Cook Islands
Treaties extended to Niue
Treaties extended to the Faroe Islands
Treaties extended to British Hong Kong
Treaties extended to Macau